Daniel Thomas may refer to:

 Daniel Holcombe Thomas (1906–2000), United States federal judge
 Daniel Edward Thomas (born 1959), American prelate of the Roman Catholic Church
 Daniel M. Thomas, early California politician and pioneer to Los Angeles
 Daniel Lleufer Thomas (1863–1940), Welsh magistrate, social reformer, and writer
 Daniel Thomas (running back) (born 1987), American football (and Canadian football) running back
 Daniel Thomas (safety) (born 1998), American football safety
 Daniel Thomas (athlete) (born 1937), Tanzanian Olympic sprinter
 Daniel Thomas (Emmerdale), a character in the soap opera Emmerdale
 Dan Thomas (infielder), American baseball player
 Dan Thomas (outfielder), American baseball player
 Dan Thomas (footballer) (born 1991), English football goalkeeper
 Dan Thomas (rugby union) (born 1993), Welsh rugby union player

See also
 Danny Thomas (disambiguation)